A Magical Encounter 1987 is the sixth studio album by Li Yuchun, released on July 30, 2014 by EE Media.

Track listing

Music videos
A Magical Encounter 1987 1987我不知会遇见你
Dance to the Music
The Unfeeling World 冷暖
Cool 酷

References

2014 albums
Chinese-language albums
Li Yuchun albums